Georg Zivier (13 February 1897 – 19 March 1974) was a German writer, theatre critic and journalist.

Life 
Born in Wrocław, Zivier was the son of the historian and writer . After studying in Greifswald and Berlin, he worked as a writer and journalist. In 1937, Zivier was expelled from the  because of his Jewish origin and later obliged to do forced labour. He nevertheless continued to write under the pseudonym "Hans Gregor" for both the Vossische Zeitung and the Berliner Tageblatt.

In 1946, Arno Scholz engaged him as head of the department "cultural politics" for the Berlin Telegraf. Until 1955, he also worked for Die Neue Zeitung as a theatre critic. Neben seiner journalistischen Arbeit schrieb er Erzählungen und Hörspiele. Für sein Theaterstück „Perlicke, perlacke“ erhielt er 1963 den .

Zivier died in Berlin at the age of 77.

Work 
 Harmonie und Ekstase: Mary Wigman (1956)
 Komödianten und fahrende Poeten (1956)
 Ernst Deutsch und das Deutsche Theater (1964)
 Das Romanische Café. Erscheinungen und Randerscheinungen rund um die Gedächtniskirche (1965)
 Berlin und der Tanz (1968)
 Deutschland und seine Juden (1971)

References

Further reading 
 Walter Tetzlaff: 2000 Kurzbiographien bedeutender deutscher Juden des 20. Jahrhunderts. Askania, Lindhorst 1982,

External links 
 
 Georg Zivier: Würdig vor der Weißen mit Schuß. In Die Zeit, Nr. 24/1964
 Abbildungen aus seinem Nachlass und Biographie beim Deutsches Tanzarchiv Köln.

20th-century German writers
German theatre critics
20th-century German journalists
Officers Crosses of the Order of Merit of the Federal Republic of Germany
1897 births
1974 deaths
People from Wrocław